Amoriguard is a water-based paint whose fillers are based on recycled industrial waste. The paint has an effective mass of solids of 70% that occupy a volume of at least 55% excluding water. It was invented in South Africa by Mulalo Doyoyo and co-developed by Ryan Purchase.

The amount of substances such as volatile organic compounds, ammonia, formaldehyde, lead, alkyl phenol ethoxylate and glycol in the paint are low or absent. It is manufactured below critical pigment volume concentration (CPVC) which means that most voids between pigment particles in the dried film are filled with solid particles as opposed to air in those products above CPVC. The paint is hydrophobic and chemical-resistant.

References

Paints
South African inventions